Bernard Inom (born August 25, 1973) is a retired boxer from France, who competed in the light flyweight division during the 1990s. He won the silver medal at the 1995 World Amateur Boxing Championships in Berlin, Germany, where he was defeated in the final by Bulgaria's Daniel Petrov.

References

1973 births
Living people
Flyweight boxers
French male boxers
AIBA World Boxing Championships medalists